The Dinker-Irvin House is a historic house at 310 Garfield Parkway Extended in Bethany Beach, Delaware.   Built in 1904 by William A. Dinker, it is one of the oldest early 20th-century summer cottages in the community.  Between 1922 and 1925 it served as the community post office, and is the only public-use building from that era to survive.  It has twice been moved, once over a property dispute, and in 2007 due to road works.  The house has been acquired by the city, with plans to convert it into a museum.

The house was added to the National Register of Historic Places in 2017.

See also
National Register of Historic Places listings in Sussex County, Delaware

References

Houses on the National Register of Historic Places in Delaware
Houses completed in 1904
Houses in Sussex County, Delaware
1904 establishments in Delaware
National Register of Historic Places in Sussex County, Delaware